is a 2000 science fiction and action Japanese straight to video full-length animated film produced by Fuji Television Network and Robot Films. The anime ties back to 2000's live action comedy film Space Travelers directed by Katsuyuki Motohiro, also produced by Fuji Television Network and Robot Films.

Plot 
In the New Cosmic Century 038, humanity is suddenly attacked by a mysterious alien civilization known as the Orbital Ring System. Soon, the entire Earth Civilization Sphere has been cut off from the space colonies, and is under the control of the ORS. Only Hayabusa Jetter, along with his band of misfit space pirates and smugglers, can break through ORS lines.

Aiding an underground resistance movement, the Space Travellers risk their lives to transport vital supplies to and from Earth. One day, however, a mysterious gentleman hires them to deliver an unmarked spherical container. Hayabusa accepts the mission, with no idea that this simple package may hold the key to mankind's destiny!

Cast

Original Japanese cast 
 Shinichiro Miki as Hayabusa Jetter
 Takaco Kato as Irene Pair
 Banjou Ginga as Crush Bomber
 Hideki Ogihara as Black Cat
 Kotono Mitsuishi as Gold Papillon
 Shigeru Chiba as Hoi
 Shinobu Adachi as Tanner
 Mahito Tsujimura as Electric Sunny
 Yutaka Aoyama as Dragon Attack
 Hisayoshi Izaki as Karl Hendrix
 Yuji Ueda as Frank
 Unshou Ishizuka as Henry
 Katsunosuke Hori as Faron
 Kiyoyuki Yanada as Ronson
 Yuki Matsuda as Announcement 1
 Mie Odagi as Announcement 2
 Tomomichi Nishimura as Tasker

English dub cast 
 Crispin Freeman as Jetter
 Debora Rabbai as Irene
 J. David Brimmer as Crush Bomber
 Jimmy Zoppi as Black Cat
 Meg Francis as Papillion
 Eddie Paul as Hoi
 Megan Hollingshead as Turner
 Chunky Mon as Sunny
 Chiam Figeroa Drumyode as Dragon Attack
 Allan Smithee as Carl
 Buddy Woodward as Frank
 Christopher Nicholas as Henry
 Steve Bednarz as Professor Falon
 Pete Zarustica as Lawson
 Chiam Figeroa Drumyode as Narrator
 Simone Grant as Announcer
 Christopher Nicholas as Squad Leader

Production
Space Travelers: The Animation began as a throwaway gag in Katsuyuki Motohiro's popular 2000 live-action movie Space Travelers, in which a Tokyo bank robbery goes disastrously wrong. As the police surround the building, the staff and hostages volunteer to help the robbers bluff their way out; each is given a code name based on a character from the robbers favorite cartoon, a nonexistent show called Space Travelers-hence the large cast of anime archetypes. Scraps of animation were made as inserts for the original movie and are reused here-hence the strange pacing of the overlong opening credits that were not originally intended to be shown in this manner. An afterthought following the movie's success, Space Travelers was reputedly inspired by Motohiro's love of Star Blazers, Gundam, and Evangelion.

Japanese staff
Character Design: Mitsuru Bakuto
Animation Director: Noboru Takahashi, Takao Shizuno, Toshi Shishikura, Toyoaki Nakajima, Yoshihiro Matsumoto
Producer: Hirotsugu Usui, Kenichiro Zaizen, Toru Horibe
Animation producer: Keiichiro Mochizuki
Assistant Director: Takayuki Inagaki
Orchestra Conductor: Sakae Sakakibara
Production Design: Yoshihiro Kamikubo
Visual Design: Takashi Okazaki

Distribution
Space Travelers: The Animation English version was distributed by Media Blasters for the North American release of the anime. Both DVD and VHS copies of the English dubbed version was released on September 25, 2001.

English staff
ADR Director: Crispin Freeman
Translation: Julia Rose
Executive producer: John Sirabella
ADR Engineer: Gary Solomon
Editing: Beth Salem
Graphic Design: Merideth Mulroney
Mixing: Joe Digiorgi
Production Assistant: Anna Yamamoto
Production manager: Scott Marchfeld
Production Supervision: Joe Digiorgi, Sean Molyneaux
Script Adaptation: Crispin Freeman

See also 
 Space Travelers, 2000 film

References

External links 
 
 
 
 

2000 films
2000s Japanese-language films
2000 anime films
2000 anime OVAs
2000 science fiction action films
Japanese science fiction action films
Animated action films
Direct-to-video animated films
Films about extraterrestrial life
Japanese animated science fiction films